Bridge in Westover Borough is an historic Open-spandrel arch bridge located in Westover, Clearfield County, Pennsylvania, United States.  It is a single span concrete bridge constructed in 1917.

It was listed on the National Register of Historic Places in 1988.

References

See also 
 National Register of Historic Places listings in Clearfield County, Pennsylvania

Road bridges on the National Register of Historic Places in Pennsylvania
Bridges completed in 1917
Transportation buildings and structures in Clearfield County, Pennsylvania
National Register of Historic Places in Clearfield County, Pennsylvania
Concrete bridges in the United States
Open-spandrel deck arch bridges in the United States